A grazing antelope is any of the species of antelope that make up the subfamily Hippotraginae or tribe Hippotragini of the family Bovidae. As grazers, rather than browsers, the "Hippo" in Hippotraginae refers to the slightly horse-like characteristics of body size and proportions: long legs and a solid body with a relatively thick muscular neck.

Genera
 Subfamily Hippotraginae

References

Bovidae

Taxa named by Victor Brooke